Ophiclinus is a genus of clinids native to the coastal waters around Australia.

Species
There are currently six recognized species in this genus:
 Ophiclinus antarcticus Castelnau, 1872 (Adelaide snakeblenny)
 Ophiclinus brevipinnis A. George & V. G. Springer, 1980 (Shortfin snakeblenny)
 Ophiclinus gabrieli Waite, 1906 (Frosted snake-blenny)
 Ophiclinus gracilis Waite, 1906 (Black-back snake-blenny)
 Ophiclinus ningulus A. George & V. G. Springer, 1980 (Variable snake-blenny)
 Ophiclinus pectoralis A. George & V. G. Springer, 1980 (Whiteblotch snakeblenny)

References

 
Clinidae
Taxa named by François-Louis Laporte, comte de Castelnau
Marine fish genera